Krisspy, real name Juan de los Santos, is a Dominican merengue tipico musician.

Discography
El Bombazo Típico (2004)
Tipico Live 2004 
Yo Soy el Flow (2006)
El guto ta aqui (2012)
Homenajes Tipico (2013)
Palos Tipicos (2016)

References 

Merengue musicians
21st-century Dominican Republic male singers
Living people
Year of birth missing (living people)